The Ministry of Education and Human Resources Development (MEHRD) is the education ministry of the Solomon Islands, headquartered in Honiara.

References

External links
 Ministry of Education and Human Resources Development
Education in the Solomon Islands
Government of the Solomon Islands